Deh-e Masin (also Romanized as Deh-e Māsīn and Deh Māsīn; also known as Deh Pāsīn) is a village in Asgariyeh Rural District, in the Central District of Pishva County, Tehran Province, Iran. At the 2006 census, its population was 555, in 120 families.

References 

Populated places in Pishva County